N00 may refer to:
 Nephritic syndrome (ICD-10 code), a medical condition with the kidneys
 Maben Airport (FAA code),  an airport in Prattsville, New York